HNoMS Skorpionen was the lead ship of her class of three monitors built for the Royal Norwegian Navy in the 1860. She was scrapped in 1908, well after her muzzle-loading guns were outdated.

The slightly later  can be seen as an improved Skorpionen-class monitor.

The name translates as The Scorpion.

Details
Skorpionen was armed with two heavy rifled muzzle-loaders in a revolving turret. She had five inches of iron armour on her deck, and her turret was protected by twelve inches of iron armour.

References
 Naval History via Flix: KNM Skorpionen, retrieved 16 January 2006.

Skorpionen-class monitors
Ships built in Horten
1866 ships